is a Japanese weekly news magazine (shūkanshi) based in Tokyo, Japan, known for its investigative journalism and frequent clashes with the Japanese government. It is considered one of the most influential weekly magazines in the country.

History and profile
Shūkan Bunshun was first published in April 1959.  The magazine is part of Bungeishunjū, a publishing group headquartered in Chiyoda, Tokyo.  From October 2014 to September 2015 Shūkan Bunshun was the fourth best selling weekly magazine in Japan with a circulation of 680,296 copies. As a general-news magazine, Shūkan Bunshun'''s  major competitor is the more conservative  Shukan Shincho.

The magazine has been praised, but also criticized for its investigative reporting which takes on both political scandals, as well as those from the world of entertainment. In the first three months of 2016, "It brought down a minister and a politician, practically destroyed the careers of a popular celebrity and a news commentator and nearly broke up one of Japan's biggest boy bands," reported the BBC which stated that the magazine was "shaking up the cosy media club" in Japan. However, the magazine was also widely criticized for its exposé of Tetsuya Komuro's  adultery, with The Japan Times stating that the story was not favorably received and that "Japanese netizens appear to have turned against Shukan Bunshun and other scandal-baiting publications.

Notable reports and controversies

Kazuyoshi Miura

In January 1984, Shūkan Bunshun reported the suspicion that Kazuyoshi Miura, a trading company owner, had someone shoot and kill his wife Kazumi in Los Angeles in November 1981 in order to obtain a huge insurance payout. They also reported the suspicion that Miura murdered his lover, Chizuko Shiraishi, in Los Angeles in 1979 and withdrew a large sum of money from her account. These cases were dubbed "L.A. Scandal". Until then, Miura had been treated as a tragic man whose wife was ruthlessly shot in Los Angeles, but overnight he was thrust into a completely opposite position. Following the Shūkan Bunshun articles, tabloid TV shows and numerous weekly magazines reported the scandal extensively day after day, night after night. In addition, they also reported extensively on Miura's privacy and his history of juvenile delinquency. The frenzy continued for a while, with numerous reporters and photographers surrounding Miura's house throughout the day, and as a result, he and his family fled to London for a time. In response, some of the press chased them all the way to London. Subsequently, an actress, a former lover of Miura, confessed that she had attacked his wife at his request in Los Angeles in August 1981. Miura was arrested in September 1985, and after a lengthy trial, the Tokyo District Court sentenced him to life imprisonment. However, the Tokyo High Court acquitted him for insufficient evidence, and in 2003, the Supreme Court rejected an appeal by the prosecution, thus confirming his innocence.(In the case of the actress who attacked his wife, he was convicted.) Note that after his arrest, he filed lawsuits against more than 400 articles in the press that he considered defamatory. According to Miura's own claim, he won more than 80% of these cases. In February 2008, Miura went to Saipan, where he was arrested by local authorities because his cases were still under investigation in the U.S. territory. In October 2008, he committed suicide after he was sent to Los Angeles.

Onyanko Club

In April 1985, Shūkan Bunshun published the photo of six members of the idol group Onyanko Club smoking in a coffee shop. This led to the dismissal of five out of the six members from the group. Since they were considered core members of the group, the scandal changed the form and fate of Onyanko Club.

Johnny & Associates

In 2001, Shūkan Bunshun ran a series on sexual harassment allegations against Johnny & Associates founder Johnny Kitagawa, along with claims that Kitagawa had allegedly forced boys to drink alcohol and smoke. The exposé was particularly notable in that Shūkan Bunshun was the only media outlet willing to publish such allegations, especially since Kitagawa was known to have control over entertainment media. Johnny & Associates sued Shukan Bunshun for defamation, and in 2002, the Tokyo District Court ruled in favor of Kitagawa, awarding him  in damages. Kitagawa filed an appeal to the Supreme Court of Japan, but it was rejected in 2004.

Minami Minegishi

On 31 January 2013,  Shukan Bunshun reported that then-AKB48 member Minami Minegishi had spent a night at the apartment home of Alan Shirahama, a member of the boy band Generations from Exile Tribe, despite that AKB48 members are not contractually allowed to have romantic relationships. In the video, she repeatedly apologized for her "thoughtless behavior" and hoped that the management would let her remain with the group, with her head shaved to show contrition. The punishment and subsequent head-shaving drew negative reactions from international media, including Agence France-Presse, CNN, Daily News, The Guardian, ABC, Spiegel Online, and Al Jazeera English, who criticized AKB48's management and Japan's idol industry over banning idols from having romantic relationships.

Becky
In January 2016, popular female TV tarento, Becky's reputation dived after Shukan Bunshun revealed that she had an affair with musician Enon Kawatani who at the time was married. Following the scandal, Kawatani announced that he had officially divorced his wife. In order to appease the public backlash and as a condition for her comeback to show business in Japan, Becky tried to officially apologize to Kawatani's wife. However, having no direct channel to her, Becky contacted the Shukan Bunshun's editorial department instead. Shukan Bunshun published the full contents of Becky’s letter at the end of April 2016.  As a result of her apologies, Becky was able to make a comeback with an appearance on TBS. In her first appearance back on TV, she appeared on Full Chorus - Music is Full Chorus on the cable channel BS Skyperfect TV. As a result of the expose, Becky lost many of her sponsors and other sources of income. According to some commentators, the sharp difference between the consequences of the affair for her compared to those for Enon, highlights Japan’s double standards for women in the entertainment world.

Sean K
In March 2016, Sean McArdle Kawakami's career as a Japanese news and business commentator came to an abrupt end after Shukan Bunshun revealed a fabricated academic background that included claims of an MBA from the world-famous Harvard Business School, as well as further false claims to have graduated from Temple University and conducted a Study abroad at Pantheon Sorbonne, University of Paris 1.

Kawai vote-buying in Hiroshima
In 2019, shortly after a report published in Shukan Bunshun'', alleging that House of Councillors's representative Anri Kawai's election office had paid campaign announcers a daily amount that exceeded the permitted legal limit, her husband Katsuyuki Kawai announced his resignation as Minister for Justice on the 30th October, 2019. In the aftermath of the initial article, further revelations followed, that the headquarters of the governing Liberal Democratic Party had transferred an unusually large amount of 150 million yen to the local Hiroshima office, prior to the election.

A list of at least 100 recipients of money, including prefectural and municipal politicians from the Hiroshima prefecture, as well as members of the couple's campaign groups, was found on a computer belonging to Katsuyuki Kawai after a raid on the couple's house and offices. On 16 June 2020, Anri Kawai and her husband, Katsuyuki Kawai, left the Liberal Democratic Party amidst the ongoing allegations of buying votes to aid her campaign for the House of Councilors. They were later arrested by public prosecutors on 19 June 2020 on charges of vote-buying and distributing around 25 million yen to politicians and supporters in Hiroshima in violation of the Public Office Elections Law.

Subsequently, in July 2020, the Hiroshima district and high court ruled that a state-paid secretary to Anri Kawai paid 2.04 million yen in total to 14 members of Kawai's campaign staff between 19 and 23 July 2019 during the election to the House of Councillors, an amount which implied payments higher than the legal limit of 15,000 yen per person per day. As a result, the secretary received a punishment of 18 months in prison, suspended for 5 years. In the wake of the conviction, the Hiroshima High Public Prosecutors Office filed a lawsuit to cancel Anri Kawai’s 2019 election victory, on the basis of guilt by association as defined under the Japanese Public Offices Election Law. On 20 January 2021, the Tokyo District Court sentenced Anri Kawai to a year and four months in prison, suspended for five years. The court ruled that her distribution of money to local legislators in Hiroshima was in violation of the Public Offices Election Law. In the indictment, one member of the Etajima Municipal Assembly and four members of the  Prefectural Assembly admitted receiving cash payments of ¥1.7 million in total. The local politicians stated that they believed Anri Kawai and her husband passed them the money to secure support for Anri Kawai in the Upper House election of 2019.

References

External links
 

1959 establishments in Japan
Investigative journalism
Magazines established in 1959
Magazines published in Tokyo
News magazines published in Asia
Weekly magazines published in Japan